Seatrade Communications (formerly Seatrade magazine) was a publisher and events company for the maritime industries, established in England by Themistocles Vokosin in November 1970.

Seatrade Communications was acquired by UBM in 2014. It continues through the news website the Seatrade Maritime News.

History 
Seatrade was founded by Themistocles Vokos in 1970. That year, the first issue of the brand's maritime magazine, Seatrade Maritime Review, was published, followed in 1997 by cruise counterpart Seatrade Cruise Review.

In 1973, Seatrade Communications launched its first event, the Money and Ship conference. Later, it would establish various cruise and maritime events, including the Seatrade Maritime Awards in 1989.

Seatrade Communications went on to launch a news website for the cruise industry in 2000, initially titled Seatrade Insider and in 2015 named Seatrade Cruise News. The maritime equivalent, Seatrade Global, was introduced in 2013, eventually becoming Seatrade Maritime News.

In 2014, Seatrade Communications was acquired by UBM for an undisclosed amount.

Seatrade Academy    
The Seatrade Academy was a shipping-focused academy, set up by Seatrade in 1978 and run in association with the Cambridge Academy of Transport. The academy has three shipping related courses: the Anatomy of Shipping, the Business of Shipping - Asia, and the Business of Shipping - UAE.

References

External links    
   
 Seatrade Maritime News   
 Seatrade Cruise News

Magazines published in England
Publishing companies established in 1970
Mass media companies of the United Kingdom
Business services companies established in 1970
2014 mergers and acquisitions